The 2009 United Kingdom local elections were elections held to all 27 County Councils, three existing Unitary Authorities and five new Unitary Authorities, all in England, on 4 June 2009. The elections were due to be held on 7 May 2009, but were delayed in order to coincide with elections to the European Parliament.

The elections produced a political landscape on the map of England that was a sea of Conservative blue.  The party snatched Derbyshire, Nottinghamshire, Staffordshire and Lancashire from Labour, as well as Devon and Somerset from the Liberal Democrats.  The Liberal Democrats did however win a majority in Bristol.  Despite the optimism for the Conservatives in seat and council gains, their share of the vote at 38% was 6% down on 2008.  That said, they had a clear 10% lead over the Liberal Democrats who achieved a respectable second place on 28%.

Labour, taking the blame in government from a worsening economic climate, soaring unemployment and the expenses scandal, lost all of its councils, with some authorities being swept clear of any Labour councillors at all. Its showing in the same day's European elections was similarly dismal, and although four years had passed since the last general election, there would be no general election in 2009; opinion polls all pointed at a heavy Labour defeat at the time.

Summary of results

Source: BBC News
Isles of Scilly Council not included in the above figures.

County councils
All 27 English County Councils were up for election. All seats on the councils were contested at this election.

Unitary authorities

Existing authorities

New authorities
Elections were held for five new unitary authorities. All councillors were elected at this election.

Mayoral elections

A mayoral election was also due to be held in Stoke-on-Trent, however voters in the city voted to abolish the directly elected mayor system in a referendum held in October 2008. The referendum decided to replace the mayor and executive system with a council leader and cabinet system of local government.

See also
2009 City of London Corporation election
2009 structural changes to local government in England
2009 European Parliament election in the United Kingdom

References

External links
Elections 2009 BBC News
Elections 2009: Councils A-Z BBC News

 
2009
2009 elections in the United Kingdom